The Syro-Malabar Cathedral of St Alphonsa also known as St Ignatius Church is a  Catholic cathedral of the Syro-Malabar rite in Preston, Lancashire. It is the cathedral of the Syro-Malabar Catholic Eparchy of Great Britain, and was previously under the Diocese of Lancaster. It is situated close to the Preston city centre, with the entrance on Meadow Street. The building was opened in 1836 and was the first church in Preston to have a spire.

Since January 2015, the church has been used as a cathedral for the Syro-Malabar Catholic Church. In 2016 Pope Francis raised the status of the church to that of cathedral and appointed Monsignor Joseph (Benny Mathew) Srampickal as the first bishop.

History

Foundation
Prior to the Catholic Emancipation Act of 1829 the first legal Roman Catholic churches were built in a simple style similar to that used for Non-Conformist chapels and often incorporated the priest's house. The church was originally a Jesuit foundation.

Building
St Ignatius is one of the earliest examples of a Gothic style in the city of Preston. Work on the church started in 1833. The architect was Joseph John Scoles, who also designed the Church of the Immaculate Conception, Farm Street, in London and the Church of Saint Francis Xavier, Liverpool for the Society of Jesus.

St Ignatius is one of the oldest surviving Roman Catholic church buildings in the city, and the architectural historian Sir Nicholas Pevsner declared it to be of national interest along with the sister Preston church of St Walburge. He said that it was an unusually planned Roman Catholic complex for this date.

Originally the church was much smaller, but in 1858 five new bays were added, including a new chancel and side chapels. The architect was Joseph Hansom who designed St Walburge's in 1847. The church still possesses original designs for stained glass by John Hardman of Hardman & Co., but the windows were not made. Further alterations were made to the church in 1885–6  by Matthew Ellison Hadfield and George Webster. The confessionals were removed providing space for two new chapels, and the remodelling of the chancel. The altar was raised and a new super altar made from Hopton Wood stone placed on it. New confessionals were built outside the walls and a third chapel, of the Sacred Heart, was added at the north end. Alabaster figures and much wood and stone carving were added by Frank Tory of Sheffield. In 1912 a side chapel and baptistery were added.

Developments
The church had a relationship with St Ignatius Catholic Primary School next door. The school was built in 1863 and extended in 2000. Masses were regularly held in the church for the school.

Outside the church is St Ignatius Square. In 1982 the square was declared to be a local conservation area, preventing any development that would significantly change the character of the historic part of Preston.

In 2001, the church saw the departure of its last resident parish priest, and it was merged with the parish of English Martyrs Church. Mass was celebrated in the church once a week, at 9:30 am every Sunday. On 11 October 2014, the parish was amalgamated to include the congregations of St Teresa's, St Joseph's and St Augustine's and was renamed the Parish of St John XXIII.

Syro-Malabar Church
On 2 December 2014, the church was closed. On 31 December 2014, Michael Campbell, Roman Catholic Bishop of Lancaster, was asked by George Alencherry, Major archbishop of the Syro-Malabar Catholic Church, for exclusive use of a church in Preston by the local Syro-Malabar community. The bishop offered St Ignatius church, which was accepted. The church will remain open for private prayer and have Masses in the Syro-Malabar rite.

People
The 19th century mystic poet Francis Thompson was baptised at the church in 1859, and the poet Fr Gerard Manley Hopkins SJ was a curate there during the late 1880s.

Gallery

See also
 List of Jesuit sites
 Listed buildings in Preston, Lancashire

References

External links

 St John XXIII Parish site

Saint Alphonsa
Roman Catholic churches in Lancashire
Grade II* listed churches in Lancashire
Roman Catholic Diocese of Lancaster
Grade II* listed Roman Catholic churches in England
Roman Catholic churches completed in 1886
Gothic Revival architecture in Lancashire
1833 establishments in England
Gothic Revival church buildings in England
Syro-Malabar Catholic church buildings
Eastern Catholic cathedrals in the United Kingdom
Syro-Malabar Catholic cathedrals
19th-century Roman Catholic church buildings in the United Kingdom